The Garth Brooks World Tour is a concert tour by American country music artist Garth Brooks. Launching in support of Brooks' albums, Fresh Horses (1995), and later Sevens (1997), the tour followed Brooks' 1993–94 tour and also featured appearances by Trisha Yearwood. The tour ran from March 12, 1996, to November 22, 1998 for a total of 220 concerts. Even though this was Brooks' final concert tour before his retirement in 2001, it drew record-breaking crowds in North America, two places in Ireland, and one place in South America, becoming the third-most attended concert tour of all time, as well as one of the decade's highest-grossing concert tours.

Background and content

After his first successful world tour, Brooks embarked on his second, covering many cities at random throughout the United States and Canada, with appearances in Ireland and Brazil. Initially launching to support Brooks' 1995 album, Fresh Horses, it also began to feature songs from Sevens, released in 1997. The concerts' outline evolved as the set lists changed throughout the tour. Each show began with smoke-filled entrance by Brooks, appearing via hydraulic lift through a piano as the opening notes of "The Old Stuff" were played. Wearing a wireless microphone headset, Brooks proceeded to dance about the stage, performing a series of old and new songs. The high energy and pyrotechnics garnered comparison to hard rock performances by bands including Kiss, while still achieving a country atmosphere. Following the release of Brooks' album, Sevens, Trisha Yearwood began making periodic appearances to perform duets, such as "In Another's Eyes".

Ticket sales and revenue
Brooks' 1996–98 world tour continued the tradition established by his first tour, selling each ticket for the same price ($20), regardless of location in the venue. Because of this, demand was extremely high breaking many records worldwide, including arena ticket sales and attendance records. Concerts began selling out in minutes, resulting in such high demand that multiple shows were added for many cities. Many of these ticket sales and attendance records were broken by Brooks once again on his 2014 tour.

Despite each ticket costing well below the average ticket prices at the time, the tour managed to gross nearly $105 million worldwide, and is listed among the highest-grossing concert tours in the 1990s. Its total attendance, approximately 5.5 million, ranks fourth all-time (behind U2, Pink Floyd, and The Rolling Stones).

Recordings

Audio
Portions of various concerts from the tour were recorded and released as a live album to coincide with the tour's conclusion. The two-disc release, called Double Live, went on to become the best-selling live album of all time, certified 21× platinum by the RIAA, and is the seventh-most shipped album in United States music history.

Video

The tour's concerts in New York City's Central Park and Dublin's Croke Park were filmed for later broadcasting. Garth: Live from Central Park was a free concert attended by 980,000 fans, the most-attended concert in the park's history. Paying homage to Woodstock, the concert was dubbed "Garthstock", featuring appearances by Billy Joel and Don McLean. It was broadcast on HBO, receiving nearly 15 million live viewers, the most of any concert special that year, and it received six Emmy Award nominations. Garth Brooks: Ireland and Back, footage of the concert of May 16, 1997, was filmed and later broadcast on NBC with a live ending featuring Brooks performing songs from the newly released Sevens from Burbank, California, receiving 15.7 million viewers. Both specials were included in Brooks' The Entertainer DVD collection, released in 2006, with the Dublin concert being renamed “Garth Brooks: Live in Ireland”. While the live ending was not a part of the main show, a couple songs from the segment were put in the Special Features.

Set list
This set list is representative of the performance of May 20, 1998 in Louisville, Kentucky. It does not represent all concerts for the duration of the series.

"The Old Stuff"
"Standing Outside the Fire"
"The Beaches of Cheyenne"
"Two Pina Coladas"
"Papa Loved Mama"
"We Shall Be Free" 
"That Summer"
"Callin' Baton Rouge"
"Unanswered Prayers"
"The River"
"The Thunder Rolls"
"American Honky-Tonk Bar Association"
"In Another's Eyes" (duet with Trisha Yearwood)
"Walkaway Joe" (performed by Trisha Yearwood)
"The Fever"
"Friends in Low Places"
"The Dance"
Encores
"Ain't Goin' Down ('Til the Sun Comes Up)"
"Longneck Bottle"
"Two of a Kind, Workin' on a Full House"
"Much Too Young (To Feel This Damn Old)"
"American Pie" (Don McLean cover)

Tour dates

Special concerts

Personnel
 Garth Brooks – vocals, acoustic guitar, electric guitar on "Callin' Baton Rouge"
 Stephanie Davis – acoustic guitar, backing vocals
 David Gant – piano, synthesizers
 James Garver – electric guitar, electric banjo on "Callin' Baton Rouge", backing vocals
 Mark Greenwood – bass guitar, backing vocals
 Jimmy Mattingly – fiddle, acoustic guitar
 Steve McClure – pedal steel guitar, electric guitar, acoustic guitar on "Callin' Baton Rouge"
 Debbie Nims – acoustic guitar, mandolin, percussion, backing vocals
 Mike Palmer – drums, percussion

See also
List of highest-grossing concert tours
List of Garth Brooks concert tours

Notes

References

1996 concert tours
1997 concert tours
1998 concert tours
Garth Brooks concert tours